Caja (meaning "box" in Spanish) can refer to:
 Caja or caixa, a Spanish savings bank similar to a credit union
 Caja project, a former Google project for reducing security risks in HTML, CSS and JavaScript
 Caja del Rio, a mesa in New Mexico, USA
 Caja vallenata, a drum similar to a tambora
 Caja China, see Nochebuena 
 Caja, the official file manager for the MATE desktop environment

People 
 Isidoro Caja de la Jara (died 1593), Spanish Roman Catholic bishop of Mondoñedo 
 Attilio Caja (born 1961), Italian professional basketball coach
 Caja Heimann (1918–1988), Danish film actress
 Jerome Caja (1958–1995), American mixed-media painter and Queercore performance artist